Illinois Route 62 (IL 62) is a  east–west state road in northeast Illinois. It runs from western Algonquin at IL 31 (Western Algonquin Bypass) to the intersection with IL 83 (Elmhurst Road) by industrial Mount Prospect.

Route description
IL 62 is called Algonquin Road for its entire length, and it is a northern parallel to Interstate 90 (I-90). It is one of the few state roads in Illinois to be shorter than the name of the road that it marks, as Algonquin Road continues westward as McHenry CR A48 to IL 47 (about ), eastward as a local road to Oakton Street and Riverside Drive by I-294 (about ), and northward as a local road to U.S. Route 14 (US 14, about ) in Fox River Grove.  The eastward extent of Algonquin Road is mainly residential, however. It is a four lane street through downtown Algonquin and then shifts to a two lane rural road east of IL 25. It returns to a four lane urban artery east of IL 59.

In 2017, IL 62 had an average daily traffic (ADT) of 35,000 on the segment between in Algonquin west of IL 25; 27,000 on the segment between IL 25 and Helm Road; and 39,000 on the segment east of IL 68.

History
SBI Route 62 was Algonquin to Chicago along the current IL 62. It followed Oakton Street and Talcott Road (in Park Ridge) to reach IL 43. By 1979, IL 62 was dropped east of IL 83. In 2014, the western terminus of IL 62 was extended west from Main Street to Western Algonquin Bypass.

The Western Algonquin Bypass opened to traffic in September 2014.  The bypass has a diamond interchange with Algonquin Road. The bypass removes through north-south traffic on IL-31 from Main Street at the intersection of Main Street and Algonquin Road/IL 62 in downtown Algonquin.

Future
The Western Algonquin Bypass is not the only limited access bypass on the table anymore as of 2015.  A southern Algonquin bypass is also being constructed as the Longmeadow Parkway which terminates at IL 62 in Barrington Hills.

Starting in 2017, the Illinois Department of Transportation (IDOT) conducted a study of IL 62 from IL 25 to IL 68. The recommended alternative is to convert this section of IL 62 into a four-lane divided highway with a separate multi-use trail.  When this upgrade is completed, IL 62 will be four lanes for substantially its entire length.

Major intersections

References

External links

 Illinois Highway Ends: Illinois Route 62

062
Algonquin, Illinois
Transportation in McHenry County, Illinois
Transportation in Kane County, Illinois
Transportation in Cook County, Illinois